The Yeşilyurt Feces Case(Turkish: Yeşilyurt Dışkı Yedirme Davası or Yeşilyurt Bok Yedirme Davası) refers to the affair that Turkish gendarmeirs under the command of the "security commander of Silopi-Judi" ("Silopi-Cudi Güvenlik Komutanı") Major Cafer Tayyar Çağlayan forced villagers to eat feces on the night of January 14–15, 1989 in Yeşilyurt (Cinibir) village of Cizre district (Mardin Province, in the present day in Şırnak Province) and related trials.

The villagers applied to the European Court of Human Rights where they were represented by Orhan Dogan.  The Court ruled in favor of the villagers and against the Turkish state.

Notes

Sources

Further reading

Zeynel Abidin Kızılyaprak, Hasan Kaya, Şerif Beyaz, Zana Farqini, İstanbul Kürt Enstitüsü, 1900'den 2000'e Kürtler - Kronolojik Albüm, Özgür Bakış Milenyum Armağanı, İstanbul, Ocak 2000, p. 84. 
Celal Başlangıç, "Parıldayan çılgın elmas", Radikal, April 28, 2003.
Celal Başlangıç, Korku Tapınağı: Güçlükonak-Silopi-Lice-Tunceli, İletişim Yayınları, 2001, .

1989 in Turkey
1990s in Turkey
Military history of Turkey
European Court of Human Rights cases involving Turkey
Crimes against humanity
History of Şırnak Province
History of Kurdistan